1969 may also refer to:

The year 1969
"1969", a song from The Stooges' 1969 album, The Stooges
1969 (Gábor Szabó album), 1969 
1969 (Julie Driscoll album), 1971
1969: The Velvet Underground Live, a 1974 live album by The Velvet Underground
1969 (film), a 1988 drama film
"1969", a song from Keith Stegall's 1996 album, Passages
"1969" (Stargate SG-1), a second-season episode of the TV series Stargate SG-1
"1969", a song from Boards of Canada's 2002 album, Geogaddi
1969: The Year Everything Changed, a 2009 narrative history book by Rob Kirkpatrick
1969 (Myka 9 album), 2009
1969 (Pink Martini and Saori Yuki album), 2011
1969 (EP), an EP by Steel Train
1969 (TV series), a docuseries on ABC